Hillhall is a townland and non-nucleated village in County Down, Northern Ireland, near Lisburn. In the 2001 Census it had a population of about one hundred people. It lies in the Lagan Valley Regional Park and the Lisburn City Council area. Hillhall Presbyterian Church is a listed building.

References 

NI Neighbourhood Information System
Draft Belfast Metropolitan Area Plan 2015
Iris Murdoch and Hillhall

External links 
Hillhall Presbyterian Church

See also 

List of villages in Northern Ireland
List of towns in Northern Ireland

Villages in County Down
Townlands of County Down
Civil parish of Drumbeg
Civil parish of Drumbo